A transit of Mercury across the Sun as seen from Mars takes place when the planet Mercury passes directly between the Sun and Mars, obscuring a small part of the Sun's disc for an observer on Mars. During a transit, Mercury can be seen from Mars as a small black disc moving across the face of the Sun.

Transits of Mercury from Mars are roughly twice as common as transits of Mercury from Earth: there are several per decade.

Transit
The Mars rovers Spirit and Opportunity could have observed the transit of January 12, 2005 (from 14:45 UTC to 23:05 UTC); however the only camera available for this had insufficient resolution. They were able to observe transits of Deimos across the Sun, but at 2' angular diameter, Deimos is about 20 times larger than Mercury's 6.1" angular diameter. Ephemeris data generated by JPL Horizons indicates that Opportunity would have been able to observe the transit from the start until local sunset at about 19:23 UTC, while Spirit could have observed it from local sunrise at about 19:38 UTC until the end of the transit.  The rover Curiosity observed the Mercury transit of June 3, 2014, marking the first time any planetary transit has been observed from a celestial body besides Earth.

The Mercury-Mars synodic period is 100.888 days. It can be calculated using the formula 1/(1/P-1/Q), where P is the orbital period of Mercury (87.969 days) and Q is the orbital period of Mars (686.98 days).

The inclination of Mercury's orbit with respect to that of Mars is 5.16°, which is less than its value of 7.00° with respect to Earth's ecliptic.

Simultaneous transits
On several occasions a related event is predicted: a transit of Mercury and a transit of Venus, or transit of Earth, will follow themselves, one after the other, in an interval of only several hours.

On November 28, 3867, there will be a transit of Earth and Moon, and two days later there will be a transit of Mercury.
On January 16, 18551, transits of Mercury and Venus will occur 14 hours apart.

See also
 Astronomical transit
 Transit of Deimos from Mars
 Transit of Phobos from Mars
 Transit of Mercury from Earth

References

Sources
 Albert Marth, Note on the Transit of the Earth and Moon across the Sun’s Disk as seen from Mars on November 12, 1879, and on some kindred Phenomena, Monthly Notices of the Royal Astronomical Society, 39 (1879), 513–514. 
 Giorgini, J.D., Yeomans, D.K., Chamberlin, A.B., Chodas, P.W., Jacobson, R.A., Keesey, M.S., Lieske, J.H., Ostro, S.J., Standish, E.M., Wimberly, R.N., "JPL's On-Line Solar System Data Service", Bulletin of the American Astronomical Society 28(3), 1158, 1996.

External links
 Transits of Mercury on Mars - Fifteen millennium catalog: 5 000 BC - 10 000 AD
 JPL Horizons

Transit of Mercury
Mars